Thomas Wyndham ( – 28 November 1814), was a Welsh politician.

He was the oldest son of Charles Edwin (formerly Wyndham) MP, and of Llanmihangel Plas and Dunraven Castle. His mother was Eleanor, the daughter of James Rooke, an MP for Monmouthshire. He was educated at Eton and at Wadham College, Oxford.

He was elected in 1789 as the Member of Parliament (MP) for Glamorgan, and held the seat until his death in 1814.

In 1810 his daughter Caroline married Hon. Windham Quin, who succeeded in 1824 as the 2nd Earl of Dunraven and Mount-Earl.

References 
 

1763 births
1814 deaths
People educated at Eton College
Alumni of Wadham College, Oxford
People from Glamorgan
Members of the Parliament of Great Britain for Welsh constituencies
British MPs 1784–1790
British MPs 1790–1796
British MPs 1796–1800
Members of the Parliament of the United Kingdom for Welsh constituencies
UK MPs 1801–1802
UK MPs 1802–1806
UK MPs 1806–1807
UK MPs 1807–1812
UK MPs 1812–1818